is a Japanese amateur astronomer and a discoverer of minor planets.

He is credited by the Minor Planet Center with the discovery of 21 numbered minor planets between 1992 and 1999. Among his discoveries are the named asteroids 7253 Nara, 7895 Kaseda, 8041 Masumoto, and 9648 Gotouhideo.

List of discovered minor planets

See also

References 
 

Discoverers of minor planets

20th-century Japanese astronomers
Living people
Year of birth missing (living people)